The Ruhnama, or Rukhnama, translated in English as Book of the Soul, is a two volume work written by Saparmyrat Nyýazow, the president of Turkmenistan from 1990 to 2006. It was intended to serve as a tool of state propaganda, emphasising the basis of the Turkmen nation.

The Ruhnama was introduced to Turkmen culture in a gradual but eventually pervasive way. Nyýazow first placed copies in the nation's schools and libraries but eventually went as far as to make an exam on its teachings an element of the driving test. It was mandatory to read Ruhnama in schools, universities and governmental organisations. New governmental employees were tested on the book at job interviews.

After the death of Nyýazow in December 2006, its popularity remained high. However, in the following years, its ubiquity had waned as President Gurbanguly Berdimuhamedow removed it from the public school curriculum and halted the practice of testing university applicants on their knowledge of the book.

Background
Epics had played multiple important roles in the social life of Central Asia across centuries. Pre-modern rulers of these regions usually appropriated the text and invented a connection between themselves and the epic-cast, to seek legitimacy for their new order.

Stalin had considered these epics to be "politically suspicious" and capable of inciting nationalist feelings among the masses; almost all significant Turkmen epics were condemned and banned by 1951–52. These epics would be rehabilitated back into public (and academic) discourse only with the onset of Glasnost. Ruhnama built on this rehabilitation phase.

Production 
Nyýazow apparently received a prophetic vision where Turkmen ancestors of eminence urged him to lead Turkmens to the "golden path of life". The first version was released in the 1990s but soon withdrawn because it did not fulfill Nyýazow's expectations. Preparations for the revised book were underway as early as April 1999, when Nyýazow declared that Mukkadesh Ruhnama would be the second landmark text of Turkmens, after the Quran.

The first volume was finally published in December 2001. On 18 February 2001, it was accepted at the 10th joint meeting of the State Assembly of Elders of Turkmenistan, and National Assembly. In September 2004, Nyýazow issued a second volume. An edited volume on the Ruhnama, published a year later, quotes his overall purpose to have lain in highlighting the nation's significant contributions to fields of art and science.

Victoria Clement and Riccardo Nicolosi suspect that the work was ghost-written.

Genre 
Scholars note Ruhnama to be a "mosaic" of different literary genres, the text combines spiritual and political advice, legends, autobiography, short stories, poems, and (fabricated) Turkmen history. Written to recover real Turkmen history without Soviet distortions, Nyýazow promised the return of an atavist past from the times of Oghuz Khagan, but only if the conduct of ancient Turkmens were emulated in accordance to his sage guidance. 

According to Amieke Bouma, a scholar of post-socialist historiography, it is best treated as an epic in its own right: the Oğuzname of the third millennium. Tanya L. Shields reads it as an anti-colonial autobiography, which gets "almost comic in its grandiosity". It has been compared to Kemal Atatürk's Nutuk, and Leonid Brezhnev's Trilogiya.

Contents

Volume 1 
Stories and proverbs are borrowed from existing Turkmen epics – Oğuzname, Book of Dede Korkut, and Epic of Koroghlu – in preaching of morals and promotion of a model code of conduct. These are often supplemented with Nyýazow's explanatory annotations. Virtues like generosity, unity, humbleness, hospitality, patience, honesty, defence of fatherland, protection of female dignity, and caring for horses (something that is placed into utmost importance by Nyýazow's successor) are emphasised upon. Some of his own poems singing paeans of the Turkmen are present, too.

The Shajara-i Tarākima (unattributed) and writings of Ahmad ibn Fadlan are relied upon for a reconstruction of national history. Some seventy states are alleged to have been established by them – the Anau culture, Parthian Empire, Achaemenid Empire, Seljuk Empire, and Ottoman Empire among others – till the eighteenth century; this entire span was simultaneously periodised into four epic-epochs. Distinct since the inception of humans, the Turkmen were the same as the Turks and descended from the venerable Noah via Oghuz Khagan, who had set up the first polity c. 5000 years ago. Warfare was apparently rare, and the state always preferred peace. Despite vague references to achaeo-historical evidence to support this range of pioneer assertions, there is a total lack of source materials, as understood in an academic sense.

The Persian sphere of influence on Turkmen polity across medieval era was neatly purged; though, Zoroaster was appropriated as a Turkmen hero who had advised people to not abide by Mazdak's path of fire-worship. Both 18th and 19th century – integral to the foundation of modern Turkmenistan – are skipped except for the mention of Magtymguly Pyragy and the Battle of Geok Tepe. Soviet Turkmenistan is described in a single page, where it is blamed for colonisation. The narrative resumes with Nyýazow ushering in independence of the state. Several of his specific policies find a mention.

Nyýazow's life is described to great details throughout the text – loss of parents in childhood, attachment to land, and his patriotic zeal for attaining sovereignty from Soviet imperialism. These descriptions form an embedded strata of the volume.

Volume 2 
Drafted with explicit parallels to the Quran, this volume asked that the Ruhnama be recited as regular prayer after purifying oneself; it was also to never lie in an improper place.

Thematically, the volume is concerned with morals and ethics. A total of 21 chapters deal with optimum manners and decorum for different situations and target audience. Nyýazow's own narration gains a position of authority; he does not always seek support from the epics to support his positions.

Society

Nyýazow 
Niccolosi notes Ruhnama to have transformed Turkmenistan into an "epideictic space", which was in "permanent, unanimous exultation of the person of Niyazov". Bouma found the Ruhnama to rebirth Turkmenistan under Nyýazow's responsible leadership. The most significant component of ideological propaganda during the later phase of Nyýazow's personality cult, the text was a marker of politico-cultural literacy and key to survival in post-Soviet Turkmenistan. Nyýazow claimed those who read it thrice were destined for heaven.

After the publication of the second volume, Nyýazow had mosques and churches display the Ruhnama as prominently as the Quran and Bible, and cite its passages during sermons. The Türkmenbaşy Ruhy Mosque, which was commissioned in 2002 at his birthplace, is the largest mosque in Central Asia and features engravings from the Ruhnama as well as the Koran across its wall and minarets. A twenty foot tall neon Ruhnama was installed at an Ashgabat park in 2003. A mural of Nyýazow drafting the Ruhnama has been installed, too. In August 2005, the first volume was launched into orbit so that it could "conquer space".

A photo-journalistic essay in 2006 noted the nation to be filled with advertisements of Ruhnama – each at a cost of two dollars. Government offices featured the Ruhnama prominently on their desk (often devoting a separate room), and state media regularly broadcast their content, with religious reverence. Official ceremonies featured hundreds of Turkmens singing from the book. 12 September was declared a national holiday.

Education 
Ruhnama was the most integral aspect of the national educational curriculum across multiple domains. This emphasis on Ruhnama obviously run in parallel to a rapid deterioration in overall standards of education.

A course in Ruhnama was mandated for all students in school as part of social sciences. It was also made a required reading across all universities, and knowledge of the text was necessary for holding state employment; this perpetuated discrimination on minorities who were not proficient in Turkmen. Turkmen State University even had a "Department of the Holy Ruhnama of Türkmenbaşy the Great", and Ruhnama Studies were pursued as a major research agenda in the country, often at the cost of academic disciplines.

The text also doubled as the sole government-approved version of history across all Turkmen schools until Nyýazow's demise, and had a substantial negative impact on academic scholarship. Several conferences on Ruhnama itself were organised by historical and cultural institutes. Other common topics were Turkmen epics, ancient Turkmen culture, and men of eminence – all deriving from Ruhnama. The only books which were allowed to be published were those whose views were in service of Ruhnama; Turkmenistan does not have a significant record of public debates surrounding history, unlike other post-Soviet states.

In 2004, primary and secondary schools were assigned between two and four hours a week to Ruhnama while universities were assigned from four to eight hours. 26 of the 57 examination cards for the 2006 Turkmenistan University Entrance Examination revolved around themes set in Ruhnama. In the words of Laura E. Kennedy, Ruhnama was taught with a theological zeal.

Berdimuhamedow 
In his early days, Ruhnama was led away from its earlier spot-of-prominence though it continued to be a part of educational curricula. In Spring of 2007, official references to Ruhnama were trimmed and around 2009-10, television broadcasts of Ruhnama stopped. Scholars have noted these incremental changes to fit Berdimuhamedow's posturing as a would-be harbinger of Turkmen renaissance, which necessitated partial critique of his predecessor's tenure.

In 2011, the requirement to pass a secondary-school examination on the Ruhnama was rescinded. And in 2014, it was finally declared that Turkmen universities would no longer test applicants on their knowledge of the book, in what Slavomir Horak interpreted as the total purge of Ruhnama from Turkmen educational curricula.

It has been noted that books written by Berdimuhamedow, Nyýazow's successor, have begun to be included in coursework. Luca Anceschi, an expert on the region and University of Glasgow professor, sees this as a transfer of Nyýazow's cult of personality to Berdimuhamedow.

Translations 
The Ruhnama has been translated to over 50 languages. These translations were primarily designed by foreign corporations to gain a cordial relationship with Nyýazow, and were not meant for international consumption.

These state-authorized translations vary substantially from one to another, leading Dan Shapira to conclude that the text remains in flux. The English version was translated from a Turkish translation of Ruhnama; it does not correspond to the Turkmen version in many places, but is generally more accurate and bulky than the Russian translation.

Media 

 Shadow of the Holy Book, a documentary on human rights abuses in Turkmenistan.

See also

 Quotations from Chairman Mao Tse-tung
 The Green Book
 Bibliolatry

Notes

References

External links
 Ks.Solyanskaya. God of all Turkmen – critical article in Gazeta.ru on Rukhnama (in Russian).

2001 books
2004 books
Turkmenistan culture
Politics of Turkmenistan
Government of Turkmenistan
Propaganda books and pamphlets
Saparmyrat Nyýazow
Historical negationism